Levitzki or Levitsky ( Łevyćkyj,  Levickij) is a surname, which is derived from the Hebrew name Levi meaning "joined to" in Hebrew. Notable people with the surname include:

 Alexander Levitzki (born 1940), Israeli biochemist
 Jacob Levitzki (1904–1956), Jewish Ukrainian-Israeli mathematician
 Mischa Levitzki (1898–1941), Jewish Ukrainian-American concert pianist

It can also refer to:
 Levitzki radical
 Levitzky's theorem
 Hopkins–Levitzki theorem

See also 
 Lewicki (f. Lewicka, pl. Lewici)
 Levitsky (f. Levitska, Levitskaya)
 Levitzky
 Levitin
 Levi

References 

Levite surnames
Jewish surnames
East Slavic-language surnames
Slavic-language surnames
Yiddish-language surnames